Martin Braun (born 18 November 1968) is a German professional football manager and former player who is the manager of Regionalliga Südwest club TSG Balingen.

The midfielder had a long career in football, and retired in 2003. After his retirement from playing he worked as an agent for SC Freiburg. He had also played for 1. FC Köln, Rapid Wien, Karlsruher SC and, until the end of his career, VfR Aalen.

Post-playing career
After his retirement in 2003, Braun worked as press officer at his former club SC Freiburg until December 2007.

In March 2008, Braun got the job as CEO at VfR Aalen. He left the club after just 10 months.

In the summer 2010, Braun signed a contract with German club FC 08 Villingen as their new manager. He was sacked by the club on 22 April 2015.

In January 2020, Braun was appointed as the new manager of Regionalliga Südwest club TSG Balingen.

References

1968 births
Living people
People from Löffingen
Sportspeople from Freiburg (region)
Footballers from Baden-Württemberg
German footballers
Association football midfielders
SC Freiburg players
1. FC Köln players
SK Rapid Wien players
Karlsruher SC players
VfR Aalen players
Bundesliga players
2. Bundesliga players
Austrian Football Bundesliga players
German football managers